The Wran ministry (1986) or Eighth Wran ministry was the 78th ministry of the New South Wales Government, and was led by the 35th Premier of New South Wales, Neville Wran, representing the Labor Party. It was the eighth of eight consecutive and final occasions when Wran was Premier.

Background
Wran had been elected to the Legislative Council of New South Wales by a joint sitting of the New South Wales Parliament on 12 March 1970. He was Leader of the Opposition in the Legislative Council from 22 February 1972. He resigned from the council on 19 October 1973 to switch to the Legislative Assembly, successfully contesting the election for Bass Hill, which he would hold until his retirement in 1986. Wran successfully challenged Pat Hills to become Leader of Labor Party and Leader of the Opposition from 3 December 1973 and became Premier following a narrow one seat victory at the 1976 election.

Labor retained government at the 1984 election, despite a 6.95% swing against Labor, losing 11 seats, but retaining a majority of 8 seats in the Legislative Assembly and a single seat majority in the Legislative Council.

Composition of ministry
The ministry covers the period from 6 February 1986 when Wran reconfigured his ministry, until 4 July 1986 when Wran resigned from the ministry and from Parliament. Barrie Unsworth was elected by Labor caucus as the Labor Leader, accepted commission as Premier and the Unsworth ministry was formed.

 
Ministers are members of the Legislative Assembly unless otherwise noted.

See also

Members of the New South Wales Legislative Assembly, 1984–1988
Members of the New South Wales Legislative Council, 1984–1988

Notes

References

 

New South Wales ministries
1986 establishments in Australia
1986 disestablishments in Australia
Australian Labor Party ministries in New South Wales